Dr. APJ Abdul Kalam Women's Institute of Technology is an engineering college in the Indian state of Bihar. Established in 2005, it is affiliated with Lalit Narayan Mithila University, Darbhanga approved by AICTE New Delhi and the government of Bihar. It is spread over 25 acres of land in the town of Darbhanga.

History 
This college was inaugurated by the then President of India, Dr. APJ Abdul Kalam in 2005. It is on the main LNMU Campus, in a separate compound that originally encompassed 10 acres but has since been expanded to 25 acres. The Lalit Narayan Mithila University has a campus spread over an area of 232 acres that was made available by the Raj family of Darbhanga through land acquisition. The campus is named Kameshwar Nagar in memory of the last Maharaja of Darbhanga, Dr. Sir Kameshwara Singh.11111

Academics

Facilities 
The Information and Technology Department,  Computer Science  and  Master of Computer Applications  are  the department in the college.

The college has seven labs for physics, chemistry,  and  mathematics. It  have  two  computer labs, a digital electronics, a  basic electronics  and  a  basic electrical  labs.

Degrees 
The college conveys a BTech degree in Information and Technology.

Admission 
Admission to B. Tech. course in Information Technology is open to all girl students who have passed 10+2 or equivalent exam, from a recognized University/Board/Council with Physics, chemistry, Mathematics and English (PCME) or Physics, Chemistry, Mathematics, Biology and English(PCMBE) with at least 50% aggregate marks in taken together. Candidate appearing in the qualifying exam, are also eligible to take entrance test, however, if selected, their admission will be subject to passing the qualifying exam, in PCME or PCMBE with at least 50% marks in PCM or PCMB at the time of admission.a

References

External links
 Official website

Engineering colleges in Bihar
Education in Darbhanga
Educational institutions established in 2005
Women's engineering colleges in India
Women's universities and colleges in Bihar
Lalit Narayan Mithila University
Colleges affiliated to Lalit Narayan Mithila University
2005 establishments in Bihar